The Altindische Grammatik is the monumental Sanskrit grammar by Jacob Wackernagel (1853–1938), after his death continued by Albert Debrunner, published in Göttingen between 1896 and 1957. The work presents a full discussion of Sanskrit phonology and nominal morphology, but a treatment of the verb is lacking. A fourth volume covering the verb was in preparation by Karl Hoffmann, but was never published, and to this day (the 2010s), a thorough discussion of the Sanskrit verbal system is lacking.

Introduction générale : Nouvelle édition du texte paru en 1896, au tome I,  Louis Renou (1957)
 Vol. I: phonology (1896) 
 Additions to Vol. I, Debrunner (1957)
 Vol. II.1: Morphology, nominal composition (1905). 
 Vol. II.2: Nominal suffixes (1954).
 Vol. III: Nominal inflection, numerals, pronouns (1930)
 Index (Richard Hauschild, 1964)

External links
 Introduction générale  (by Bayerische Staatsbibliothek digital)
 Altindische Grammatik, Bd. I, Lautlehre  (by Bayerische Staatsbibliothek digital)
 Altindische Grammatik, Bd. II/1, Einleitung zur Wortlehre, Nominalkomposition
 Altindische Grammatik, Bd. III, Nominalflexion, Zahlwort, Pronomen  (by Bayerische Staatsbibliothek digital)

Sanskrit grammar
Grammar books